The following United States Army units and commanders fought in the First Battle of Winchester (May 25, 1862) of the American Civil War. The Confederate order of battle is listed separately.

Abbreviations used

Military rank
 MG = Major General
 BG = Brigadier General
 Col = Colonel
 Ltc = Lieutenant Colonel
 Cpt = Captain
 Lt = Lieutenant

Other
 c = captured

Union Forces near Winchester
MG Nathaniel P. Banks

Department of the Shenandoah
MG Nathaniel P. Banks

References
 The Opposing Forces at First Winchester

American Civil War orders of battle